The Kortrijk Spurs, for sponsorship reasons known as House of Talent Spurs, are a Belgian semi-professional basketball club based in Kortrijk. As of 2023, the club features 62 teams which makes it the largest basketball club in Belgium. Its first men's team currently plays in the Top Division Men One (TDM1).

The Spurs are applying for a license in the BNXT League starting from the 2023–24 season, aiming to become the first team from Kortrijk in the top flight division since the 1970s.

Home games are played in the event hall of Sportcampus Lange Munte, which can host 2,400 people.

History 
The Kortrijk Spurs were founded after a merger between K Basketteam Kortrijk and BC Kortrijk Sport took place in 2019. The same year, the first men's team promoted from the Top Division Men Two to the Top Division Men One, the Belgian second level.

In the Spurs' second season, Christophe Beghin (former three-time Belgian Player of the Year) was announced as the new head coach. They managed to reach the finals of the Top Division I in 2022, eventually losing to Guco Lier.

The last team from Kortrijk to play in the Belgian top division, was IJsboerke Kortrijk during the 1970s. The biggest feat of the team was their victory of the Belgian Cup in 1976. In January 2023, the Spurs announced they are for a license in the BNXT League starting from the 2023–24 season.

References 

Basketball teams in Belgium
Kortrijk
Basketball teams established in 2019
2019 establishments in Belgium